Rhythm Is My Business is a 1962 studio album by the American jazz singer Ella Fitzgerald. The album was recorded with a big band and arranged and conducted by the American R&B organist Bill Doggett.

DownBeat magazine gave this album 3½ stars, commenting that the emphasis here was on "swinging".

Billboard reviewed the album in September 1962 and said that it "rates a lot of play".

Track listing
For the 1962 Verve LP release; Verve MG V-4056
Side one

Side two

1999 CD reissue bonus tracks

Note: Track 7 has only been re-issued on CD in mono, due to the loss of the stereo master tape.

Personnel
 Ella Fitzgerald – vocals
 Taft Jordan – trumpet
 Ernie Royal – trumpet
 Joe Wilder – trumpet
 Melba Liston – trombone
 Kai Winding – trombone
 Britt Woodman – trombone
 Carl Davis – reeds
 Jerry Dodgion – reeds
 William Shakesnider – reeds
 Les Taylor – reeds
 Phil Woods – reeds
 Hank Jones – piano
 Mundell Lowe – guitar
 Lucille Dixon – double bass
 George Duvivier – double bass
 Gus Johnson – drums

References

1962 albums
Albums arranged by Bill Doggett
Albums conducted by Bill Doggett
Albums produced by Norman Granz
Ella Fitzgerald albums
Verve Records albums